is a Japanese novel written by Yoru Sumino and illustrated by loundraw.

A manga adaptation, illustrated by Idumi Kirihara, was serialized in Futabasha's Monthly Action from September 2017 to August 2018.

Media

Novel
The novel is written by Yoru Sumino and illustrated by loundraw. Futabasha published the volume on February 19, 2016.

On October 23, 2019, Seven Seas Entertainment announced they licensed the series for English publication. They released the volume on March 12, 2020 digitally and on July 7, 2020 in print.

Manga
A manga adaptation, illustrated by Idumi Kirihara, started serialization in Monthly Action on September 23, 2017. The series finished serialization in Monthly Action on August 25, 2018. The series was published in three tankōbon volumes.

Seven Seas Entertainment is also publishing the manga adaptation in English. They published all three volumes as one omnibus volume.

Volume list

Reception
Demelza from Anime UK News praised the novel, calling it a "compelling read from start to finish".

Rebecca Silverman from Anime News Network praised the manga adaptation for both its story and characters, while calling it a bit predictable at times. Danica Davidson from Otaku USA recommended the series, stating it was "carefully plotted and well stated".

The manga adaptation was nominated for the Eisner Award for Best U.S. Edition of International Material—Asia in 2021.

References

External links
 Official website 
 

2016 Japanese novels
Drama anime and manga
Futabasha manga
Seinen manga
Seven Seas Entertainment titles
Slice of life anime and manga